Sorel may refer to:

Places
 Sorel, Somme, a commune of the Somme département, in France
 Sorel-Tracy, city in Quebec, Canada
 Sorel Airport, near Sorel-Tracy

People

Given name
 Sorel Mizzi (born 1986), poker player

Surname
 Agnès Sorel (1421–1450), mistress of Charles VII of France
 Albert Sorel (1842–1906), French historian
 Cécile Sorel (1873–1966), French comic actress
 Charles Sorel, sieur de Souvigny (1602–1674), French novelist
 Edward Sorel (born 1929), American illustrator and cartoonist
 Georges Sorel (1847–1922), French philosopher and theorist of revolutionary syndicalism
 Gustaaf Sorel (1905–1980), Belgian painter of gloomy subjects
 Jean Sorel (born 1934), French actor
 Léon de Sorel (1655–1743), French naval officer, governor of Saint-Domingue
 Louise Sorel (born 1940), American actress
 Nancy Sorel (born 1964), Canadian-American TV actress
 Ruth Abramovitsch Sorel (1907–1974), German dancer and choreographer
 Stanislas Sorel (1803–1871), French engineer who invented Sorel cement, a hydraulic cement
 Ted Sorel (1936–2010), American actor

Fictional characters
 Sorel Bliss, character from Noël Coward's 1925 play "Hay Fever"
 Amy Sorel, fictional character in the Soul series
 Dominic Sorel, fictional character in the anime and manga series Eureka Seven
 Julien Sorel, the main character of the novel The Red and the Black by Stendhal
 Raphael Sorel, fictional character in the Soul series

Other uses
 Sorel (brand), a shoe brand established by the defunct Canadian company Kaufman Footwear, now a branded subsidiary of Columbia Sportswear
 Sorel (horse), in the French epic poem The Song of Roland
 Sorel cement (also known as magnesia cement), a non-hydraulic cement

See also
Sorell (disambiguation)
Sorrel (disambiguation)
Sorrell (disambiguation)